The Samsung SGH-E715 is a clamshell-style mobile phone created by Samsung Electronics.

Features
The phone has features including:
 Multiple photo shooting sizes and qualities: VGA (640 X 480), QVGA (320 X 240), QQVGA (160 X 120), Mobile (128 X 128).
 Integrated LED flash
 Built in web browser
 Multiple messaging capability: SMS, EMS, MMS
 Configurable wallpapers and ringtones
 Java for additional games and applications
 Alarm clock 
 Calendar
 Calculator

Availability
The SGH-E715 was sold via T-Mobile USA and used the same hardware to operate on European frequencies.

References

External links
 Mobiledia Review
 Samsung USA SGH-E715 Homepage

E0715
Mobile phones introduced in 2003
Mobile phones with infrared transmitter